Committee on the Medical Effects of Air Pollutants (COMEAP) is a group of scientific experts who provide independent and authoritative advice to the UK government on the health effects of air pollution. Its core members are typically senior academics or professionals drawn from fields such as atmospheric chemistry, environmental health, epidemiology, and toxicology; a single lay member helps to ensure the committee's technical work is accessible to the public.

Activities 

COMEAP's periodic reports often make headline news on issues such as how many people die from air pollution, and the connections between air pollution and disease. In 2001, COMEAP warned that long-term exposure to particulates increases risk of premature death, especially from cardiovascular disease. One of its recent reports, issued in 2022, reviewed almost 70 epidemiological studies and concluded that air pollution is likely to increase the risk of cognitive decline and dementia in older people.

COMEAP has also reported on the relative risks of breathing air pollution in different situations. In January 2019, for example, it reported that pollution from particulates is up to 30 times higher on the London Underground than on streets in the roads above, with the Northern Line having the worst air quality.

COMEAP also advises on how to best communicate air pollution risks to the public (such as through the 1–10 point warning scale used in London) and how people should change their behaviour when air pollution levels are high.

Reports 

COMEAP has issued numerous reports on air pollution and health, including:

 Asthma and Outdoor Air Pollution  (1995)
 Non-Biological Particles and Health  (1995)
 The Quantification of the Effects of Air Pollution on Health in the United Kingdom  (1998)
 Guidance on the Effects on Health of Indoor Air Pollutants (2001)
 Cardiovascular Disease and Air Pollution (2006)
 Review of the UK Air Quality Index (2011)
 Quantification of Mortality and Hospital Admissions associated with Ground-level Ozone (2015)
 Long-term Exposure to Air Pollution and Chronic Bronchitis (2016)
 Nitrogen Dioxide (2018)
 Mortality effects of Long-term Exposure to Air Pollution in the UK (2018)
 Long-term Exposure to Air Pollution (2018)
 Air Pollution and Cardiovascular Disease (2018)
 Air Pollution: Cognitive Decline and Dementia (2022)

Membership 

COMEAP's current chair is Anna Hansell; previous chairs have included Frank J Kelly, Jon Ayres, and Sir Stephen Holgate. Other members have included Roy M. Harrison, Jonathan Grigg, David Newby, and H. Ross Anderson.

See also
 Air Quality Expert Group (AQEG)

References

External links
 
 COMEAP Reports and Statements

Public health in the United Kingdom
Air pollution in the United Kingdom
Air pollution organizations